Michael L. Simmons (1896–1980) was an American screenwriter and novelist.  The 1933 film The Bowery was based on his novel Chuck Connors.

Filmography

 First Aid (1931)
 The Honor of the Press (1932)
 The Bowery (1933)
 The Awakening of Jim Burke (1935)
 The Raven (1935)
 Girl of the Ozarks (1936)
 Venus Makes Trouble (1937)
 All American Sweetheart (1937)
 Murder in Greenwich Village (1937)
 Little Miss Roughneck (1938)
 Juvenile Court (1938)
 Flight to Fame (1938)
 Squadron of Honor (1938)
 The Little Adventuress (1938)
 Tropic Fury (1939)
 Missing Daughters (1939)
 Romance of the Redwoods (1939)
 Mutiny on the Blackhawk (1939)
 Scattergood Baines (1941)
 Scattergood Meets Broadway (1941)
 Scattergood Rides High (1942)
 Scattergood Survives a Murder (1942)
 Eyes of the Underworld (1942)
 Cinderella Swings It (1943)
The Crime Smasher (1943)
 Two Weeks to Live (1943)
 They Live in Fear (1944)
 Landrush (1946)

References

Bibliography
 Erickson, Hal. From Radio to the Big Screen: Hollywood Films Featuring Broadcast Personalities and Programs. McFarland,  2014.
 Kinnard, Roy & Crnkovich, Tony . The Films of Fay Wray. McFarland, 2005.
 Pitts, Michael R. Poverty Row Studios, 1929–1940: An Illustrated History of 55 Independent Film Companies, with a Filmography for Each. McFarland & Company, 2005.

External links

1896 births
1980 deaths
American screenwriters
People from New York City